Sardor Sabirkhodjaev (born 6 November 1994) is an Uzbekistani footballer who currently plays for Pakhtakor Tashkent.

Career

Club
On 26 July 2017, FC Bunyodkor announced the return of Sabirkhodjaev.

Career statistics

Club

International

Statistics accurate as of match played 11 September 2018

References

External links 
 

Uzbekistani footballers
1994 births
Living people
FC Bunyodkor players
FC Shurtan Guzar players
Pakhtakor Tashkent FK players
Association football midfielders
Uzbekistan Super League players
Uzbekistan international footballers